The 2001 Hajj stampede resulted in the deaths of at least 35 pilgrims on 5 March 2001 during the Hajj in Mecca. The incident took place during the Stoning of Satan ritual. The pilgrims were killed after a large crowd surged towards one of the three giant pillars representing the devil at which worshippers cast stones. A civil defense official later attributed the casualties to congestion and jostling among the pilgrims, resulting in some, particularly the elderly, tripping and falling.

See also
Incidents during the Hajj

References

2001 in Saudi Arabia
20th century in Mecca
Disasters in religious buildings and structures
Incidents during the Hajj
Human stampedes in 2001
Human stampedes in Saudi Arabia
2001 disasters in Saudi Arabia